The United States Nordic Combined Championships is a Nordic Combined competition held annually since 1932 to crown the national champions of the United States.

Medalists

References

 
Nordic Combined national championships